Meena Bazar, Karimabad is a bazaar located in Karimabad area of Gulberg Town in Karachi, Sindh, Pakistan. It was inaugurated in 1974.

It is a woman-centered shopping street with ladies wear, fashion shops for ladies, restaurants and with a few men's wear shops. There is also a sports equipment market nearby. It also has many mehndi or henna shops for dyeing ladies' hands for special occasions like wedding events and Eid. 

Meena Bazaar is also popular among tourists looking for locations of cultural interest in Karachi.

See also 
 Empress Market

References

Bazaars in Karachi
Tourist attractions in Karachi
1974 establishments in Pakistan